Homelix variegata is a species of beetle in the family Cerambycidae. It was described by Karl Jordan in 1894. It is known from the Republic of the Congo, the Democratic Republic of the Congo, and Gabon. It feeds on Coffea canephora.

References

Phrynetini
Beetles described in 1894